Charles Edward O'Connor (27 May 1882 – 4 November 1936) was an Australian rules footballer who played with Carlton in the Victorian Football League (VFL).

Notes

External links 

Charlie O'Connor's profile at Blueseum

1882 births
1936 deaths
Australian rules footballers from Victoria (Australia)
Carlton Football Club players